Anna Louise Föhse, Princess of the Holy Roman Empire (22 March 1677 in Dessau – 5 February 1745) was a German imperial princess. Born as a commoner to Rudolf Föhse (d. 1698), the court pharmacist in Dessau, and his wife, Agnes Ohme (d. 1707), she married Leopold I, Prince of Anhalt-Dessau and was later ennobled by Leopold I, Holy Roman Emperor.

Life 
Anna Louise Föhse was the childhood sweetheart and later morganatic wife of Prince Leopold I of Anhalt-Dessau.  Despite great resistance on the part of her own father and of her mother-in-law Henriette Catherine, the daughter of Frederick Henry of Orange-Nassau, she married him in 1698 at age 22.  After paying  to the imperial treasury, she was raised to Imperial Princess by Emperor Leopold I three years later, giving her a higher rank than him.

In the same year 1698, he took up government.  Anna Louise and Leopold had ten children together; Leopold also fathered two illegitimate children in 1733 and 1735.

Relations between Anna Louise and her mother-in-law later improved.  She also had a good relationship with the Prussian royal family.  Her career was the subject of the tabloid press of the day, and of several plays.  She died in 1745; broken-hearted by her loss, Leopold died only two years later.

Issue 
 William Gustav (1699-1737)
 Leopold II Maximilian (1700-1751), Leopold's successor and a Prussian Field Marshal
 Dietrich (1702-1769), also a Prussian field marshal
 Frederick Henry (1705-1781)
 Henriette Marie Louise (1707-1707)
 Louise (1709-1732), married Victor Frederick, Prince of Anhalt-Bernburg
 Maurice (1712-1760), also a Prussian field marshal
 Anna Wilhelmine (1715-1780)
 Leopoldine Marie (1716-1782) - married to Frederick Henry of Brandenburg-Schwedt (1709-1788)
 Henriette Amalie (1720-1793)

Footnotes

1677 births
1745 deaths
People from Dessau-Roßlau
People from Anhalt-Dessau
17th-century German people
18th-century German people
German princesses
Morganatic spouses of German royalty